Seri dymka is a species of fly in the genus Seri.

References

Platypezidae
Insects described in 1961
Taxa named by Edward L. Kessel